Khalil Ullah Khan (known as Khalil; 2 February 1934 – 7 December 2014) was a Bangladeshi film and television actor. He earned Bangladesh National Film Award for Best Supporting Actor for his role in Gunda in 1976.

Early life and career 
Khan grew up in Kumarpara, Sylhet. He was a young Ansar officer in the early 1950s. He was suspended from service following an altercation with a union board chairman.

Film producer Masud Chowdhury discovered Khan and cast him in his film Sonar Kajol in 1953. The film was directed jointly by Kalim Sharafi and Zahir Raihan. He went on to act in 11 Urdu language films including Raihan's Sangam, the first color film in Pakistan. After the liberation war he revived his career through films such as Utshorgo and Ekhane Akash Neel.

His received National Film Award for acting in Alamgir Kumkum's Gunda in 1976. In 2012, he won Lifetime Achievement Award. He earned notability for his 'Mia' role on BTV play Sangsaptak. He was also the president of Bangladesh Film Artistes' Association.

Works
 Preet Na Jane Reet (1963)
 Sangam (1964)
 Bhawal Sanyasi (1966)
 Begana (1966)
 Kar Bou (1966)
 Hamdam (1967)
 Iss Dharti Per (1967)
 Poonam ki Raat (1967)
 Uljham (1967)
 Gori (1968)
 Janglee Phool (1968)
  Bini Sutar Mala
 Masud Rana (1974)
 Sangram (1974)
  Ei ghor ei shongshar (1996)
  Wada
  Bou Kotha Kow
 Sonar Cheye Dami
  Megher Pore Megh
  Modhumoti
 Gunda
  Fuler Moto Bou
  Dadima

Death
Khan died of heart ailments on 7 December 2014 at Square hospital in Dhaka, Bangladesh. He had been suffering from lung, liver and kidney ailments for some years and was hospitalized several times after falling critically ill.

References

1934 births
2014 deaths
People from Sylhet
Madan Mohan College alumni
Bangladeshi male film actors
National Film Award (Bangladesh) for Lifetime Achievement recipients
Best Supporting Actor National Film Award (Bangladesh) winners